Jaffa is a popular carbonated soft drink produced in Finland by Hartwall. Jaffa is usually orange flavoured, however different flavours are sold. 

The brand is also notable for the numerous popular posters and designs created for it by graphic designer Erik Bruun.

History 

The original orange flavoured Hartwall Jaffa was introduced in 1949 and the selection has expanded to 11 different flavours since then. Currently Hartwall Jaffa is the third best-selling soft drink in Finland after internationally sold cola beverages such as Coca-Cola.

References

External links 
 Hartwall Jaffa – Official site 

Soft drinks
Carbonated drinks